Squeeze is a New Zealand drama film, directed by Richard Turner and released in 1980. The film stars Robert Shannon as Grant, a bisexual businessman torn between his relationships with his fiancée Joy (Donna Akersten) and his boyfriend Paul (Paul Eady).

The film, made six years before homosexuality was decriminalized in New Zealand, was refused funding by the New Zealand Film Commission, and instead its $100,000 budget was funded almost entirely by individual donors within Auckland's LGBT community.

The film premiered in July 1980 in Auckland, and had its North American premiere in October 1980 at the Chicago International Film Festival. It was subsequently screened in selected markets in 1981, including Sydney and Los Angeles, and at the 1981 Festival of Festivals in Toronto.

Critical response
Kevin Thomas of the Los Angeles Times reviewed the film positively, writing that "What is most important about 'Squeeze' is the steadfast compassion with which it views its hero…’Squeeze' is a drama of most painful self-discovery, well-acted and heightened by an aptly moody, restless score." Thomas criticized the score, but still thought that the execution matched the theme the film tried to make.

George Williams of the Sacramento Bee also criticized the film's audio, writing that the dialogue was sometimes "nearly unintelligible as it is mixed in with the background noise of street scenes and confrontations in gay bars", but concluded that the film was redeemed especially by the strength of Shannon and Eady's performances.

Meaghan Morris of the Sydney Morning Herald criticized the portrayal of Joy as "like something out of the 1950s", and characterized some of its dramatic scenes as something akin to soap opera, but praised Shannon's performance and wrote that the film is "worth seeing just for the evocation of the streetlife of Auckland".

Soundtrack
The movie's title derives from the song Squeeze by Toy Love. The film features the song along with music from other Auckland post-punk bands, The Features and the Marching Girls.

References

External links
 

1980 films
1980s New Zealand films
1980 drama films
1980 LGBT-related films
New Zealand drama films
New Zealand LGBT-related films
LGBT-related drama films
Male bisexuality in film
Films set in Auckland
Films shot in New Zealand
1980s English-language films